George Samuel Wegg Horne (7 September 1811 – 17 September 1873) was a  Victorian (Australia) colonial politician and attorney.

Biography
Horne was born in Chiswick, Middlesex and was admitted as an attorney in England in 1833. He practised in London until 1834, then migrated to Van Diemen's Land (now Tasmania) and was admitted to the Supreme Court of Tasmania in 1835. Horne then resided in Portland, Victoria) and then went to England 1843. He returned to Melbourne in 1844 and was admitted as an attorney there in 1845.

Horne was elected to the Victorian Legislative Council for the Belfast and Warrnambool in September 1854, a position he held until March 1856. 
In November 1856 Horne was elected to the Victorian Legislative Assembly for the Electoral district of Warrnambool, he resigned in February 1861.
Horne also contested the seats of Kilmore in 1853 and Rodney in 1856.

From 11 March 1857 to 29 April 1857 Horne was Commissioner Crown Lands and Survey and Surveyor General of Victoria; he was also commissioner Public Works 21 December 1858 to 27 October 1859.
After politics, Horne resumed work as an attorney and practised in Melbourne as a senior partner in Horne, Parton & Hellins c.1859 to 1860. He then practised with Horne & Read c.1862.

Horne went to New Zealand around 1867 and lived in Nelson. He was elected member of the Nelson Provincial Council for the Grey electorate and served for 13 months (1868–1869).

Horne died in Nelson in 1873 and was buried at Wakapuaka Cemetery. He was married to Maria and they had several children.

References

External links
Separation of the Department of Land and Works announcement of Horne as commissioner Public Works in The Argus 23 December 1858 at Trove, National Library of Australia
Death notice in The Sydney Morning Herald 3 November 1873 at Trove, National Library of Australia

1811 births
1873 deaths
People from Chiswick
English emigrants to Australia
Members of the Victorian Legislative Assembly
Members of the Victorian Legislative Council
Surveyors General of Victoria
Burials at Wakapuaka Cemetery
19th-century Australian politicians
19th-century New Zealand politicians